The Italian Union of Public Administration Workers (UILPA) is a trade union representing civil servants and related workers in Italy.

The union was founded in 1998, when the Italian Union of State Workers merged with the Italian Union of Public Employees, and the University and Research Federation.  Like all its predecessors, it affiliated to the Italian Labour Union.  Workers in universities and research later split away, to form the Italian Union of Research, University, and Higher Art and Musical Education Workers.  As of 2004, the union claimed 67,702 members.

General Secretaries
1998: Salvatore Bosco
c.2010: Nicola Turco

External links

References

Civil service trade unions
Trade unions established in 1998
Trade unions in Italy